The 2002 season of 2. deild karla was the 37th season of third-tier football in Iceland.

Standings

Top scorers

References

2. deild karla seasons
Iceland
Iceland
3